Roprachtice is a municipality and village in Semily District in the Liberec Region of the Czech Republic. It has about 300 inhabitants.

Geography
It lies in the Giant Mountains Foothills. The Hrádecký Brook springs here and flows across the municipality.

History
Roprachtice was probably founded in the 13th century. The first written mention of the village is from 1352. The oldest known owners of the village were the Waldstein family. Important owners of Roprachtice also included the Caretto-Millesimo family and the House of Rohan, who owned it in the 18th and 19th centuries.

Demographics

Sights

The main landmark of Roprachtice is the Church of the Holy Trinity from 1766. A valuable building is also the rectory, which dates from 1793.

U borovice is a privately owned observation tower. Next to the tower is a museum of typewriters.

In popular culture
The movies Forgotten Light and Krakonoš a lyžníci were filmed mainly in Roprachtice.

References

External links

Villages in Semily District